Nazia Ejaz is a Pakistani Australian artist. She is a daughter of Ejaz Durrani and Pakistani singer Noor Jehan. After living in Australia for 14 years, she is now based in Karachi.

Early life and education
She was born to Noor Jehan. She received her Graduate Diploma in Indian Art and its history at School of Oriental and African Studies (SOAS) in 1996. She has a double Masters in Fine Art from the Slade School of Fine Art, and University of South Australia.

Award
She is a recipient of Staff Nomination Award, University of South Australia, 2015.

Exhibition
 Love Letters, Canvas Gallery

References

Living people
Alumni of SOAS University of London
Alumni of the Slade School of Fine Art
Australian emigrants to Pakistan
Australian people of Punjabi descent
Australian women artists
Naturalised citizens of Australia
Pakistani emigrants to Australia
Pakistani women artists
Punjabi people
University of South Australia alumni
Year of birth missing (living people)